4,5-Diaminopyrimidine is a diaminopyrimidine.

See also
 2,4-Diaminopyrimidine

References

Aminopyrimidines